The Lianghekou Dam (meaning: "mouth of two rivers") is a concrete-face rock-fill dam currently under construction on the Yalong River in Yajiang County, Sichuan Province, China. The dam is located at the confluence of the Yalong, Xianshui and Qingda Rivers. Studies for the dam were completed between 2005 and 2009 with preliminary construction beginning that year. Major works on the dam officially began in October 2014. The first two generators were commissioned in September 2021 and the final unit was put in service in March 2022.

Over 4,900 people were forced to relocation during construction of the dam.

See also 

 List of power stations in China

References

Hydroelectric power stations in Sichuan
Dams in China
Dams under construction in China
Concrete-face rock-fill dams
Dams on the Yalong River
Buildings and structures in the Garzê Tibetan Autonomous Prefecture